Falsohippopsicon albosternale is a species of beetle in the family Cerambycidae. The species was described by Breuning in 1942.

References

Agapanthiini
Beetles described in 1942
Taxa named by Stephan von Breuning (entomologist)